Katrin Garfoot (born 8 October 1981) is a German-born Australian former cyclist who won a bronze medal at the 2014 Commonwealth Games in the road time trial. She started cycle racing in 2011, three years after moving to Australia, having previously competed in athletics up to junior level. In addition to this, Katrin was a teacher at Southport State High School on the Gold Coast.

At the 2016 UCI Road World Championships she won the bronze medal in the women's time trial, 8 seconds behind the winner Amber Neben. In the 2017 road world championships, Garfoot became the second Australian after Anna Wilson to achieve two individual medals at the same road world championships, with a bronze in the individual time trial and a silver in the road race. She completed the three-peat in the 2018 national time trial championships, two and a half minutes clear of second place over the 29.5 km course.

After three and a half years signed with the Orica–AIS UCI women's team, Garfoot confirmed that she would not re-sign with the Orica in 2018, choosing to focus on family life in Australia while keeping her local Commonwealth Games on the Gold Coast as a focus. In 2018, Katrin will represent the Queensland Academy of Sport on the road and in the velodrome, and was selected as a part of the Cycling Australia national team to race at UCI international road races in Australia.

On 12 July 2018, Garfoot announced her retirement from professional cycling.

Major results

2012
 2nd Overall Canberra Women's Tour
 6th Overall Battle on the Border
 7th Overall Santos North Western Tour
 8th Noosa GP
2013
 Oceania Road Cycling Championships
1st  Road race
4th Time trial
 1st Overall Tour of the Murray River
1st Stages 2 (ITT), 4 & 5
 1st Overall Sam Miranda Tour of the King Valley
1st Stage 1
 1st Overall Mersey Valley Tour
 1st Noosa GP
 2nd Overall Santos North West Tour
1st Stage 2
 2nd Overall National Capital Tour
 4th Overall Battle on the Border
 6th Overall Tour of the Goldfields
1st Stages 1, 2 & 4
 6th Overall Shipwreck Coast Classic
1st Stage 1 (ITT)
 6th Overall Jarvis Subaru Adelaide Tour
2014
 2nd Overall Gracia–Orlová
 3rd  Time trial, Commonwealth Games
 National Road Championships
3rd Road race
4th Time trial
 3rd Chrono Champenois
 Oceania Road Cycling Championships
4th Time trial
5th Road race
 4th Overall Tour of Zhoushan Island
1st Mountains classification
 8th Giro del Trentino Alto Adige-Südtirol
2015
 Oceania Road Cycling Championships
1st  Time trial
3rd  Road race
 UCI Road World Championships
4th Time trial
7th Team time trial
 4th Overall Festival Luxembourgeois du Cyclisme Féminin Elsy Jacobs
 4th Giro del Trentino Alto Adige-Südtirol
 5th Overall Emakumeen Euskal Bira
 5th Durango-Durango Emakumeen Saria
 6th Overall Women's Tour of New Zealand
1st Stage 3
 7th Holland Hills Classic
 8th Crescent Women World Cup Vårgårda TTT
2016
 Oceania Road Cycling Championships
1st  Time trial
4th Road race
 National Road Championships
1st  Time trial
4th Road race
 1st  Overall Women's Tour Down Under
1st Stage 1
 1st Chrono Champenois
 1st Launceston Cycling Classic
 2nd Overall Grand Prix Elsy Jacobs
 2nd Noosa GP
 3rd  Time trial, UCI Road World Championships
 4th Overall Ladies Tour of Qatar
1st Stage 2
 4th Overall Auensteiner–Radsporttage
 4th Dwars door de Westhoek
 6th Giro dell'Emilia Internazionale Donne Elite
 8th GP de Plouay – Bretagne
 8th La Flèche Wallonne Féminine
 8th Holland Hills Classic
 8th Time trial, Omloop van Borsele
 9th Time trial, Olympic Games
2017
 National Road Championships
1st  Time trial
1st  Road race
 UCI Road World Championships
2nd  Road race
3rd  Time trial
 3rd Overall Emakumeen Euskal Bira
1st Stage 3
 4th Overall Ladies Tour of Norway
 4th Durango-Durango Emakumeen Saria
 7th Overall Women's Tour Down Under
 7th Strade Bianche
 9th La Flèche Wallonne Féminine
2018
 1st  Time trial, Commonwealth Games
 National Road Championships
1st  Time trial
5th Road race
 2nd Team pursuit, National Track Championships
 3rd Overall Women's Tour Down Under
1st  Sprints classification
1st Stage 2
 4th Overall Women's Herald Sun Tour

See also
 2014 Orica–AIS season

References

External links
 
 

1981 births
Living people
Australian female cyclists
Olympic cyclists of Australia
Cyclists at the 2016 Summer Olympics
Commonwealth Games medallists in cycling
Commonwealth Games gold medallists for Australia
Commonwealth Games bronze medallists for Australia
Cyclists at the 2014 Commonwealth Games
Cyclists at the 2018 Commonwealth Games
Medallists at the 2014 Commonwealth Games
Medallists at the 2018 Commonwealth Games